United Nations Security Council resolution 848, adopted without a vote on 8 July 1993, after examining the application of the Principality of Andorra for membership in the United Nations, the Council recommended to the General Assembly that Andorra be admitted.

See also
 Member states of the United Nations
 List of United Nations Security Council Resolutions 801 to 900 (1993–1994)

References

External links
 
Text of the Resolution at undocs.org

 0848
 0848
 0848
1993 in Andorra
July 1993 events